Tarbela Dam Airport  is located near the Indus River in the Haripur District of Khyber-Pakhtunkhwa in Pakistan, and is part of the Tarbela Dam project.

External links

Airports in Khyber Pakhtunkhwa
Haripur District